Ferocious is a Canadian psychological thriller film released in 2013. Written and directed by Robert Cuffley, the film stars Amanda Crew, Kim Coates, Dustin Milligan, Michael Eklund and Katie Boland.

Synopsis
Leigh Parrish, a small town Saskatchewan girl who becomes a television star in America, returns to her hometown with her manager Callum Beck. She has a secret that leads her to a dingy nightclub owned by Sal, and things devolve into a night of violence that also involves the club's bartender, Eric, and Tess, an obsessed fan of Leigh's.

Cast
 Amanda Crew as Leigh Parrish
 Kim Coates as Sal / Maurice
 Michael Eklund as Eric
 Dustin Milligan as Callum
 Katie Boland as Tess
 Stephen Huszar as Steve Sherwood

Production
Ferocious was filmed in 2012 in Saskatoon, Saskatchewan.  Actors Kim Coates and Michael Eklund are both Saskatoon natives.

References

External links

2013 films
Canadian psychological thriller films
English-language Canadian films
2013 psychological thriller films
2010s English-language films
2010s Canadian films